Gummileru is a village in Konaseema district of the Indian state of Andhra Pradesh. It is located in Alamuru mandal of Rajahmundry revenue division.

References

External links

Villages in East Godavari district
Jain temples in Andhra Pradesh
Buildings and structures in East Godavari district
20th-century Jain temples
20th-century architecture in India